The Night of the Rabbit is a point-and-click adventure video game developed and published by Daedalic Entertainment for Microsoft Windows and OS X. The Night of the Rabbit was released on 28 May 2013.

Synopsis 
On the last days of summer vacation, 12-year old aspiring magician Jerry Hazelnut finds a formula to create a "carrot flame". After he puts the ingredients together, a traveling case appears out from nowhere. Inside the case is a wand, a magic hat and an anthropomorphized upright albino rabbit wearing a coat. The rabbit introduces himself as the Marquis de Hoto. He tells the world has many parallel universes. The roots of very old trees are connected to each other deep in the ground and can make a connection with the ones in the parallel universes. The Marquis de Hoto is a "Treewalker" and uses a magic spell to travel between the parallel universes. Furthermore, inside each parallel universe there lies invisible magic which can be revealed by using a special hollow coin that Jerry owns, which Marquis de Hoto enchants.

The Marquis de Hoto offers Jerry a chance to become his apprentice in order to become a magician. Jerry needs to follow a long term course, although the rabbit claims Jerry will be home again before dinner. Jerry agrees and travels with Marquis de Hoto to a beautiful fairy-tale looking parallel universe. They end up in the town of Mousewood which is inhabited by talking woodland animals. Through the Marquis and the Magician of Mousewood, Jerry learns about "portal trees" and travels to different worlds to learn four spells in order to become a true Treewalker, all the while helping the residents of Mousewood. During this time, he sees a recurring image of a person who appears to know him.

However, Jerry finds out this world is about to be attacked by an evil magician named Zaroff. Zaroff already conquered many parallel universes through a spell by using four cursed nails. After learning his fourth spell the Marquis disappears, and Jerry returns home to find many years have passed, his home abandoned and his mother long gone. Determined to break the curse, Jerry returns to Mousewood and finds the residents under Zaroff's influence. He captures four lizards posing as humans who are Zaroff's accomplices, and looks for the clearing of the "First Tree" wherein Zaroff lies. Trapped in-between worlds, he makes another "carrot flame" which summons forth a masked magician who shows Jerry the way. He also learns his father has been removed from his world and all memories of him erased.

Jerry confronts Zaroff, who traps him on his stage and forces him through twisted plays of the portal worlds. Jerry conquers them and removes the nails, and uses them to defeat Zaroff. The Magician of Mousewood explains their backstory: Zaroff was the last apprentice of the Marquis de Hoto, who both had grown corrupted by darkness. In order to combat Zaroff's rise, the First Tree sent out a memory of the Marquis before his corruption in order to train a new apprentice. However, when the memory of the Marquis entered Jerry's world, something had to go; therefore his father was banished to the space in-between worlds and memories of him forgotten. The memory of the Marquis is forced to stay behind at the First Tree, and the two promise never to forget one another.

Jerry returns to Mousewood to celebrate the completion of his training before returning home in time for dinner with his father restored to his world. The Magician of Mousewood reveals he had been keeping the real Marquis de Hoto, the masked magician, prisoner. However, the real Marquis states his motto: "Nothing is impossible", hinting that he might have found a way to escape.

Gameplay 
The game is based upon classic principles of point-and-click-adventure games.

The player controls Jerry by using a computer mouse. Conversations with other characters are held and various objects must be put into the inventory. These objects can be used on their own or combined in order to solve puzzles. Jerry has a special hollow coin which can be used to reveal the hidden magic. To use the hollow coin, the spacebar or middle mouse button must be pressed, which will allow Jerry to find clickable objects.

In addition, there are several collectibles, such as stickers and audiobooks, that can be found in order to unlock achievements. The game also features a quartets card mini-game that can be played at any time.

Reception 

The Night of the Rabbit received positive reviews. It received an aggregated score of 75.00% on GameRankings based on 27 reviews and 75/100 on Metacritic based on 45 reviews. The game's graphics, soundtrack, and voice-acting were praised, whilst criticism was directed towards some of the puzzles with obscure solutions, and the game's less-than-helpful hint system.

Prequel & Sequel 
On the website of Matthias Kempke there are links to two audio plays of The Night of The Rabbit. They are only in the German language and their will probably be no english translation of it. Matthias Kempke is also working on a novel.

References

External links 
 

2013 video games
Adventure games
Fantasy video games
MacOS games
Windows games
Daedalic Entertainment games
Point-and-click adventure games
Video games about children
Video games about rabbits and hares
Video games developed in Germany
Works about vacationing